Incilius ibarrai (common name: Jalapa toad) is a species of toad in the family Bufonidae. It is found in the central and southern highlands of Guatemala and adjacent Honduras. The specific name ibarrai honors Jorge Alfonso Ibarra (1921–2000), then-director of the Guatemalan National Natural History Museum.

Systematics
Incilius ibarrai belongs to the monophyletic Incilius coccifer group, which, in addition to the said species, includes Incilius cycladen, Incilius pisinnus, Incilius porteri, and Incilius signifer.

Description
Adult males measure  and adult females  in snout–vent length. The snout is weakly pointed in dorsal view and rounded laterally. The cranial crests are well-developed, while the parietal crests are low. The supra-tympanic crest is large and bulbous; the tympanum is visible. The parotoid glands are large. The toes are one-half to one-third webbed. Preserved specimens are pale yellowish gray mid-dorsally, becoming more yellow laterally and gradually shading into pale yellow ventrally.

Habitat and conservation
It breeds in ponds, marshes, and wet meadows. It is threatened by habitat loss. Chytridiomycosis is also as a possible threat, and may have caused the decline of some formerly robust populations, e.g., in the Sierra de las Minas biosphere reserve.

References

ibarrai
Amphibians of Guatemala
Amphibians of Honduras
Amphibians described in 1954
Taxonomy articles created by Polbot
Taxa named by Laurence Cooper Stuart